{{Taxobox
| image = Brachycerus undatus.jpg
| image_caption = Brachycerus undatus
| regnum = Animalia
| phylum = Arthropoda
| classis = Insecta
| ordo = Coleoptera
| subordo = Polyphaga
| infraordo = Cucujiformia
| superfamilia = Curculionoidea
| familia = Curculionidae
| subfamilia = Entiminae
| tribus = Brachyderini| tribus_authority = Schönherr, 1826
| subdivision_ranks = Genera
| subdivision = See text
}}

The Brachyderini' are a weevil tribe in the subfamily Entiminae.

 Genera 
 Achradidius Aedophronus Alatavia Araxia Baladaeus Brachyderes Caulostrophilus Caulostrophus Epiphaneus Epiphanops Hypolagocaulus Lagocaulus 
 Mecheriostrophus 
 Neliocarus 
 Neocnemis 
 Orophiopsis 
 Parafoucartia 
 Parapholicodes 
 Pelletierius 
 Pholicodes 
 Podionops 
 Proscopus 
 Strophocodes 
 Strophomorphus 
 Strophosoma 
 Taphrorhinus 
 Thaptogenius''

References 

 Schönherr, C.J. 1826: Curculionidum dispositio methodica cum generum characteribus, descriptionibus atque observationibus variis seu Prodromus ad Synonymiae Insectorum, partem IV. Fleischer, Lipsiae: X + 338 pp

External links 

Entiminae
Beetle tribes